The Women's short race at the 2001 IAAF World Cross Country Championships was held at the Hippodrome Wellington in Ostend (Oostende), Belgium, on 25 March 2001.  Reports of the event were given in The New York Times, in the Herald, and for the IAAF.

Complete results for individuals, for teams, medallists, and the results of British athletes who took part were published.

Race results

Women's short race (4.1 km)

Individual

Teams

Note: Athletes in parentheses did not score for the team result

Participation
An unofficial count yields the participation of 114 athletes from 34 countries in the Women's short race.  This is in agreement with the official numbers as published.  The announced athlete from  did not show.

 (1)
 (4)
 (6)
 (1)
 (4)
 (5)
 (5)
 (6)
 (4)
 (5)
 (1)
 (1)
 (6)
 (2)
 (1)
 (5)
 (1)
 (6)
 (6)
 (4)
 (1)
 (5)
 (1)
 (1)
 (1)
 (6)
 (2)
 (4)
 (1)
 (6)
 (6)
 (4)
 (1)
 (1)

See also
 2001 IAAF World Cross Country Championships – Senior men's race
 2001 IAAF World Cross Country Championships – Men's short race
 2001 IAAF World Cross Country Championships – Junior men's race
 2001 IAAF World Cross Country Championships – Senior women's race
 2001 IAAF World Cross Country Championships – Junior women's race

References

Women's short race at the IAAF World Cross Country Championships
IAAF World Cross Country Championships
2001 in women's athletics